The Student Rec Center at Indiana State University is a building nearing completion on Indiana State's campus in Terre Haute, Indiana.

The rec center will include a three-court gymnasium and a multi-activity court with a durable surface suitable for such activities as soccer and roller hockey. Plans also call for a leisure aquatics facility, jogging track, climbing wall, fitness center, spinning room, two multi-purpose rooms, student lounge, juice bar, and outdoor recreation yard.

References 

Indiana State University board approves student rec center plans

Indiana State University
Buildings and structures in Vigo County, Indiana